AI: The Somnium Files is an adventure video game developed and published by Spike Chunsoft, which released for Nintendo Switch, PlayStation 4, and Windows on September 17 2019, and Xbox One on September 30, 2021. Set in Tokyo, the first installment in the franchise follows Special Agent Kaname Date, who investigates serial killings and enters suspects' memories to extract information to help solve them. The game was directed and written by Kotaro Uchikoshi, with character designs by Yūsuke Kozaki. A sequel, AI: The Somnium Files – Nirvana Initiative, was released in 2022.

Gameplay
AI: The Somnium Files is a mystery adventure game that has 2 areas of gameplay: investigation and somnium exploration. The story progresses through branching paths leading to multiple different endings, based on choices the player makes; the player only gets a full view of the story by playing through each route. Rather than starting over from the beginning several times to see different paths, the player can skip directly to the branching points using an in-game flow chart.

During the investigation, the player character, Special Agent Kaname Date, uses his artificial intelligence unit, Aiba, to assist Date while performing his duties. Her features include X-ray vision and zooming, to further the investigation in the real world. This part of the game takes place in a 2D, visual novel style format. 

During the somnium gameplay, Date uses a device called the Psync Machine to enter the memories of suspects or key witnesses who do not want to share information with him, in the form of dreamscapes called the "Somnium", to find clues and extract the information by solving puzzles. The puzzles involve examining objects and choosing an action to perform with it, as well as solving mental locks – obstacles standing in the way of clues – allowing the player to sink deeper into the character's subconscious. There is a six-minute time limit before the dreamscape collapses, and as actions take time to perform, the player must be careful in deciding what to do. Within the somnium gameplay, Aiba takes the form of a humanoid and acts as the player avatar, while being able to explore in a 3D environment.

Synopsis

Setting
AI: The Somnium Files takes place in a technologically advanced near-future Tokyo, and follows Special Agent Kaname Date of the top-secret police department ABIS (Advanced Brain Investigation Squad). ABIS investigates crimes through a process called "Psyncing," in which a Psyncer such as Date explores the Somnium, or dream world, of persons of interest in a case. Psyncing is a powerful process that can often retrieve clues the subject is only subconsciously aware of, but it is limited to a maximum of six minutes for the Psyncer and subject's safety. Any further than 6 minutes can damage the brain of both the Psyncer and subject, resulting in death.

Date is assisted by an artificial intelligence (A.I.) housed in his cybernetic left eye named Aiba, who can communicate with Date via an artificial nerve, provide him with enhanced vision modes such as X-Ray and night vision, and hack various electronics. Aiba also assists Date's dream world investigations by acting as his avatar in Somnium.

Plot
Kaname Date, who lost his left eye and all his memories six years prior, is called to investigate the murder of Shoko Nadami, whose left eye was removed before her death. He finds her daughter Mizuki at the scene, unable to speak because of her trauma. Date investigates Mizuki's dream to find out what she witnessed, and the plot diverges based on the player's choices in her Somnium.

In the left branch of Mizuki's Somnium, Date finds evidence implicating Renju Okiura, Mizuki's father and Shoko's ex-husband, before discovering his body with the left eye missing. Boss, the head of ABIS, reveals that she suspects the killer to be a copycat of the Cyclops Serial Killings, an unsolved case from six years prior in which the victims' right eyes were removed posthumously. Date interrogates then Psyncs with net idol Iris Sagan, who was seen with her producer Renju the day before. The story diverges once more from Iris's Somnium.

In the left branch of Iris' Somnium, Iris's friend Ota knocks Date unconscious and escapes. Date awakens to a livestream of Iris's attempted murder, but traces the video source in time to save her. Date Psyncs with Ota to learn more. The left branch of Ota's Somnium leads to the Ota Route, in which the case remains unsolved, but Ota reconciles with his mother. The right branch of Ota's Somnium leads to the Mizuki Route, in which additional evidence implicates congressman So Sejima as Iris's would-be killer. A gunfight at the Sejima residence leaves So dead and Date comatose. Mizuki Psyncs with Date to save him, and the case is resolved.

In the right branch of Iris's Somnium, Date witnesses the Original Cyclops Serial Killings. Afterward, Iris's murder is livestreamed, and Date fails to arrive in time, resulting in Ota's death as well. Date learns that the original Cyclops Killers were a duo of a "murderous psychopath" who committed the murders. One of them was the yakuza chairman Rohan Kumakura, the other was currently imprisoned as "#89." Date interrogates #89, who tells the story of a detective-turned-assassin named Falco. Falco worked for the Kumakuras and tried to go clean after falling for Hitomi, Iris's mother. After Boss appears in #89's Somnium, Date searches for her. On her work computer he discovers a video of Boss shooting So Sejima with his left eye missing. The story then locks until the player completes other routes.

Back in the right branch of Mizuki's Somnium, Date sees a frozen corpse that looks like Iris. The following day, Date learns that Renju was involved in a car crash and ran from the hospital. During his search he witnesses So Sejima leaving a fishery warehouse, and discovers Iris's frozen body inside. Date Psyncs with So, in which he saves Iris's life. After the Somnium, he discovers Iris is alive, and wonders if he altered reality by saving her. Date attempts to interrogate #89, who escapes with Renju's help. Date takes Iris along to search for him, but the two are attacked by mercenaries and Iris reveals that she is being targeted by a secret organization. Date Psyncs with her to determine the truth.

After the left branch of Iris's Somnium, Date learns that Renju attempted to take her to an off-limits chemical plant. At the plant, Date finds a stolen prototype Psync Machine. Suddenly, Iris collapses, so Date attempts to save her by Psyncing, but fails. She dies in his arms, concluding the Iris Route. After the right branch of Iris's Somnium, Date doubts Iris and goes to Hitomi, who reveals that Iris has a malignant brain tumor causing her delusions. Iris goes missing, and Date eventually finds her body in the fishery warehouse. Aiba realizes the body is not Iris, and identifies it as Manaka Iwai, Hitomi and Renju's old classmate. Date learns from Hitomi that Manaka is Iris's birth mother, and she was killed 18 years ago by So Sejima's son Saito. Date also learns the truth of the Psync Machine: staying past the time limit causes the Psyncer and subject to swap bodies. Hitomi reveals she knows Iris's location, and takes Date to the chemical plant, where #89 knocks him out. The story locks, allowing the other locked route to be completed.

After watching Boss shoot So, Date finds and Psyncs with her. In her Somnium, he realizes that the murders were committed by one person using the prototype Psync Machine to swap bodies with each of the victims. Their eyes were removed because it was necessary for the machine to work. The killer, in Boss's body, identifies himself as Saito Sejima, and explains that the murders were revenge against Date for taking his body six years ago, Date's true identity is Falco, and #89 is Rohan in Falco's body. Saito threatens to kill Hitomi, who had been tied down with explosives in an unknown location, unless Date swap bodies with him. Date complies, but Saito's promise is broken when the explosives detonate after the bodyswap is complete, killing Hitomi. Aiba shocks Saito unconscious and Date blacks out, concluding the Annihilation Route.

In the final route, Date confronts Saito, who is now in #89/Falco's body having swapped with and killed Rohan. Saito forces them to switch bodies. In his original body, Date regains his memories and recalls how he attempted to save Iris and Hitomi from the yakuza by switching bodies with Rohan, but discovered the truth of the Cyclops Killings. Saito learned about Psyncing and used the prototype to swap bodies, but an accident caused both of them to lose their memories. In the present day, Saito prepares to kill Iris and Hitomi, but Iris's friends come to her rescue. With no other options to save Hitomi, Date activates Aiba's self-destruct function to kill Saito, seemingly also killing Aiba, whose backup data was deleted by rogue ABIS engineer Pewter. With the case resolved, the police pay for Iris's treatment, and three months later she has made a full recovery. Iris takes Date to the warehouse district where Aiba appears in augmented reality. It is revealed that Aiba survived by downloading and recompiling the fragments of her personality in the cloud, and that the Boss replaced Date's prosthetic eye with Aiba earlier that day. The cast of the game celebrates by dancing to Iris's song Invincible Rainbow Arrow, concluding the Resolution Route.

Development

AI: The Somnium Files was developed by Spike Chunsoft, and was written and directed by Kotaro Uchikoshi, produced by Yasuhiro Iizuka, designed by Akira Okada, and includes character designs by Yūsuke Kozaki and music by Keisuke Ito. Kozaki was approached by Uchikoshi for his role as character designer due to being an internationally known artist, and how Uchikoshi wanted the art to have a worldwide appeal. The game was developed with a higher budget than that of Uchikoshi's previous work, the Zero Escape series, which according to Uchikoshi helped allow him to express his concept for the game in a way that he was unable to with Zero Escape. Comparing AI: The Somnium Files with Zero Escape, Uchikoshi described AI: The Somnium Files as being made more with adventure game fans in mind, in contrast to Zero Escape heavy use of cutscenes. Ahead of the game's release, a similar system to Aiba, a "Borges A.I." system known as Kudan, was introduced in the light novel trilogy Danganronpa Togami (2015–2017); further Easter eggs throughout AI: The Somnium Files indicate it to be set in the same fictional universe as the Danganronpa series.

Two of the game's core themes are eyes and "different types and expressions of love", reflected in how the title AI is pronounced "eye" and in how  is the Japanese word for love. The title also has additional meanings in that it is pronounced like the English word "I" and is short for "artificial intelligence", and the "Somnium" in the subtitle is taken from the Latin word for "dream". The idea of entering characters' dreams to solve cases was proposed by Iizuka. Uchikoshi thought it was intriguing, so he decided to use it in the game. The game's investigation-based puzzles are intentionally designed to be less difficult than those in the Zero Escape series, and are described by Uchikoshi as a modern take on the style of Hideo Kojima's 1994 adventure game Policenauts. Other influences on the game included EVE (1995) and The Silver Case (1999); Okada additionally mentioned Life Is Strange (2015), Detroit: Become Human (2018), Heavy Rain (2010) and The Walking Dead (2012–2019) as influencing his work on the game.

The game was first teased at a Game Developers Conference 2017 press event under the working title Project Psync, with a piece of artwork depicting an eye. Spike Chunsoft announced the game the following year during an Anime Expo 2018 panel, and released a first teaser trailer introducing Date. In January 2019, Spike Chunsoft started promoting the game with a YouTube and Twitter account for the character Iris.

The game was released in North America on September 17, 2019, in Japan on September 19, and in Europe on September 20 for Nintendo Switch, PlayStation 4, and Windows with both English and Japanese audio. In addition to the standard edition, a "Special Agent Edition" was also released, which included an artbook, the game's soundtrack, an Iris acrylic stand, a set of stickers, and a game box. Due to manufacturing delays and increased demand, the North American physical release was delayed until September 24, 2019.
An Xbox One version was announced during Tokyo Game Show on September 30, 2021. It was released digitally on the same day, and is available to Xbox Game Pass subscribers.

Reception

AI: The Somnium Files received generally positive reviews, according to review aggregator Metacritic, and was the 12th best reviewed Nintendo Switch game of the year. Reviewers generally praised the plot and strong writing to the game; they noted it was simultaneously cerebral and thought-provoking while remaining accessible and understandable. The voice acting was also considered "superb", with the actors bringing life to the characters. The dream sequences were also praised as creative and inventive. The art and character designs received approval as well. There was also some light criticism of certain "sleazy" jokes as being not particularly funny and painting Date as less sympathetic and more of an "oaf" than he was presumably intended to be.

In Japan, the game failed to chart in the Media Create top 10 and Famitsu top 30 in its release week. The PlayStation 4 version ranked 27th with 2,267 copies sold, while the Nintendo Switch version was 33rd with 1,767 copies sold in the Dengeki top 50. The PC version of the game was among the best-selling new releases of the month on Steam.

The game was nominated for "Best Adventure Game" at the Famitsu Dengeki Game Awards 2019.

Sequel

A sequel, AI: The Somnium Files – Nirvana Initiative, was released in June 2022 for Nintendo Switch, PlayStation 4, Windows, and Xbox One. Uchikoshi returned to write it, while the first game's designer and assistant director Akira Okada took over as director.

Notes

References

External links
 
 

2019 video games
Adventure games
Detective video games
Nintendo Switch games
PlayStation 4 games
Spike Chunsoft video games
Video games about police officers
Video games developed in Japan
Video games set in Tokyo
Video games with alternate endings
Windows games
Single-player video games
Video games about parallel universes
Video games about amnesia
Video games about dreams
Video games about multiple time paths
Video games written by Kotaro Uchikoshi
Mystery video games
Xbox One games
Works about the Yakuza